The River des Peres (French: rivière des Pères) is a  metropolitan river in St. Louis, Missouri. It is the backbone of sanitary and storm water systems in the city of St. Louis and portions of St. Louis County.  Its largest tributaries are Deer Creek and Gravois Creek. At St. Louis, the river has a mean annual discharge of 79 cubic feet per second.

Location

Mouth Confluence with the Mississippi River near River City Casino, St. Louis: 
Source Creve Coeur, Missouri:

History
The name, meaning "River of the Fathers," is of French origin, and was given by locals because a mission of Jesuit Catholic priests resided near the confluence of the river with the Mississippi in the early 1700s. In the late 1600s, a group of Kaskaskias Indians crossed the Mississippi and established a settlement near the river's confluence with the Mississippi. In 1702, French missionaries, following French practice, established their own settlement adjacent to the Kaskaskia's settlement. The French settlement, like others in the region, was dedicated to missionary work and trade with Native Americans. In 1703, the Kaskaskia abandoned their settlement; the following year, the French traders and priests followed.  There is also a city of the same name, Des Peres, located in west St. Louis County.

In preparation for the 1904 World's Fair, the portion of the river that flows through Forest Park was disguised by temporary wooden channels. Shortly thereafter, that portion was placed entirely underground. The River des Peres has functioned as a combined sanitary sewer and storm drain for over 100 years. In the early 1930s, following high demand for preventive safety measures brought on by a series of fatal floods, the river was channelized, with its upper sections redirected underground in large sewage pipes.  Design and construction was led by the United States Army Corps of Engineers, Horner & Shifrin, and the Works Progress Administration. The lower banks of the river, most notably along Willmore Park and the River des Peres Greenway, were lined with quarried limestone, producing a distinct, lasting landmark. "Safety First / W.P.A." is written in mosaics along the eastern banks. This southern length of the river now has a sewer beneath it, and fills only as a result of heavy rains.

In 1988, the American Society of Civil Engineers designated the River des Peres Sewage & Drainage Works as a National Historic Civil Engineering Landmark for the calculations involved, the large-scale trench dewatering methods, and the soil stabilization procedures.

Some of the worst flooding of the Great Flood of 1993 occurred near where the river flows into the Mississippi River.

Current condition
River des Peres enters underground culverts from north of Forest Park, emerges south of the park into concrete channels, and debouches into the Mississippi.

An artificial water flow that emulates the river was created through Forest Park, using the city's water supply. This is often mistakenly considered a re-creation of the original River des Peres. However, the water flow here is deliberately produced, not derived from rainfall, or runoff, etc., and cannot be considered a re-creation of the river. The resemblance of the water feature to a picturesque river scene was an attempt to maintain continuity with the appearance of the rest of Forest Park's landscape, which for the most part, excepting significantly recent additions to the Art Museum (by Peter Walker), upholds the original, early twentieth century pastoral design intentions of George Kessler. The design received notable objections due to its generous use of resources to present the appearance of a healthy river.

The river is currently part of the combined sewer and stormwater system of its watershed, which includes large portions of St. Louis City and County. It is administered by the St. Louis Metropolitan Sewer District (MSD), which concerns itself primarily with sanitary and storm water management; and the United States Army Corps of Engineers, which handles general flood and safety concerns. MSD is working to separate the sanitary and stormwater systems, which will enable more recreational use of the river.

The planned River des Peres Greenway Project created an  linear park along the river from Forest Park to the Mississippi.  It is part of a larger system of works as part of the River Ring project by The Great Rivers Greenway District.

See also
List of Missouri rivers

References

External links
A Sewer Runs Through It- an article that appeared in the Riverfront Times on December 6, 2000.
River des Peres Greenway Project
The Harnessed Channel: How the River Des Peres Became an Open Sewer
The River des Peres Watershed Coalition
A River Runs Through It...Again Landscape Architecture Magazine. February 2004. Editorial critique of waterscape in Forest Park.
River des Peres Living Room at B.E.L.T.
"River des Peres Plan" 1916. St. Louis City Planning Commission
Documentary video by HEC-TV, 'A Sewer Runs Through It' 

Rivers of Missouri
Tributaries of the Mississippi River
Geography of St. Louis
Subterranean rivers of the United States
Historic Civil Engineering Landmarks